Act of Aggression is a 1975 French / Italian crime film directed by Gérard Pirès.

Cast 
 Jean-Louis Trintignant - Paul Varlin
 Catherine Deneuve - Sarah
 Claude Brasseur - André Ducatel
  - Escudero
 Milena Vukotic - Le juge
 Franco Fabrizi - Sauguet
 Delphine Boffy - Patty
 Leonora Fani - Josy
  - Hélène
 Jacques Rispal - Raoul Dumouriez
 Robert Charlebois - Justin, un motard

References

External links 

1975 crime films
1975 films
French films about revenge
Italian films about revenge
1970s French-language films
1970s Italian films
1970s French films